Cuma (also, Cumakənd and Cumay) is a village and municipality in the Shaki Rayon of Azerbaijan.  It has a population of 1,984.

References 

Populated places in Shaki District